Founded in 2014, SportPesa is a sports news, technology and sports betting brand with operations in Kenya, Tanzania, South Africa, Italy, Ireland, the Isle of Man, and the UK, where it operates in conjunction with TGP Europe.

Ownership 
SportPesa in Kenya is owned and operated by Milestone Games, a Kenyan-owned company. it is jointly owned with the betting/gaming arm of RCS Media, a giant media company in Europe.

Sports involvement

Kenya 
SportPesa heavily invested in the development of the local sports leagues and tournaments in Kenya and Tanzania and South Africa, among them, the 2014 Wambia Memorial Football Tournament in Kakamega, the Francis W. Maingi memorial Football Tournament in Kitui, the Obulala Football Tournament and the Koth Biro Football Tournament in Ziwani.

In 2015 SportPesa announced their title partnership with the Super 8 Premier League, ran by Extreme Sports Limited, with over 100 grassroots teams from Nairobi estates registered to participate it grew into a full-fledged league in 2016 after financial support from SportPesa. The league aimed to improve grass-root football, with a number of players later joining top-flight Kenyan teams.

In football, the brand previously supported the Kenyan Premier League, Kenya’s domestic top tier club competition, as well as a key sponsor of the Harambee Stars and Harambee Starlets, Kenya's national men's and women's football teams respectively.  This partnership has saw the introduction of linkages with English clubs Everton FC, Arsenal, Southampton and Hull City.  The key focus of the contract with the Football Kenya Federation was to ensure that the country develops as a footballing nation, with the stated mission of qualifying for the 2022 FIFA World Cup.

At the height of its support to the Kenyan Premier League, the brand invested in a reward and honour programme working closely with a joint panel of SJAK and KPL coaches who selected the best players, coaches and team managers.  The highlight of this annual programme culminated in the gathering of the football community for the prestigious Footballer of the Year (FOYA) Awards where winners selected are celebrated.

In 2015 SportPesa launched their Kits for Africa initiative.  An initiative that encourages football fans to donate their old kit for underprivileged, grassroots teams across Africa. 

In 2016 Kenya’s first female WBC world super bantamweight champion, Fatuma ‘Iron Fist’ Zarika became a SportPesa ambassador and has defended her title in two fights. In 2018, Zarika travelled to Liverpool, UK, to undergo intense training with former world title Cruiserweight champion Tony Bellew and his coaching team prior to her match with Yamileth Mercado in Nairobi.  

In 2016 SportPesa signed a five-year deal with Kenya Rugby Union along with Kenya Premier League teams Gor Mahia and AFC Leopards and then second division Nakuru All Stars.

In February 2017 a team dubbed the SportPesa All-Stars, selected from the 18 Kenyan Premier League clubs, became the first-ever team from the country to play in England, where they lost 2–1 to a Hull City Select side at the KCOM Stadium. This partnership was geared towards exposing Kenyan players to the international stage.

In April 2017 SportPesa announced a three -year agreement with Spanish top flight football League - LaLiga to become the Official Betting Partner.

The company's sponsorship status of teams in Kenya was suspended following the withdrawal of its operating license in July 2019 – the license was reinstated in October 2020 after the brand signed a five-year deal with Milestone Games Ltd which then took over the rights to operate under the name SportPesa.

In 2021, SportPesa signed a new sponsorship deal with Wazee Pamoja League.  A league that consist of 11 teams who’s players are +33 years old, the focus being to provide a place for retired footballers or just people over the age of 33 to have a space to train, play and network.

In 2022, SportPesa agreed a three-year shirt sponsorship with Kenya Rugby Union team Kenya Sevens Rugby and a one-year shirt sponsorship with Kenya Premier League team Gor Mahia.

Tanzania 
SportPesa announced its five-year partnership with Simba SC in 2017. The Vodacom Premier League titans, Simba SC were the first Tanzanian team to expand SportPesa’s portfolio of Africa teams. Later in 2017, SportPesa signed another five-year sponsorship deal with Dar es Salaam’s Young Africans Sport Club (Yanga SC), the 26-time Tanzanian League champions.

In 2019, SportPesa Tanzania maximized it’s LaLiga agreement to host Sevilla FC in a post-season game against Simba SC at the National Stadium. As part of the LaLiga World Challenge programme, Sevilla hosted a business seminar to teach local teams how to maximise their football partnerships. In return, the Spanish team was introduced to local Tanzanian culture and events.

In 2019, SportPesa Tanzania signed a three-year deal with promising Super Welterweight boxer Hassan Mwakinyo.  In the same year they flew Hassan to camp in Liverpool (United Kingdom) to train with leading Boxing professionals including former world title Cruiserweight champion Tony Bellew.

SportPesa currently has sponsorship deals with Singida Big Star ,Namungo and Young Africans SC, all clubs from the Tanzania Premier League. The three teams have signed different period sponsorship deals. Additionally, SportPesa sponsored Singida United FC for a year but they are no longer on the Tanzania Premier League.

South Africa 
In August 2016, SportPesa announced that it had signed sponsorship deals with Cape Town City F.C., a team in the South Africa's Premier Soccer League (PSL), being the first sports betting company to headline sponsor a team in the Premier Soccer League. Although no longer title sponsors of the club SportPesa South Africa are proud official betting partners of ‘The Citizens’ and they continue to interact with the PSL club and their fans through match day experiences, community upliftment programs and commercial partnerships. 

In 2019, South African football legends ‘The General’ Teko Modise and Doc Khumalo become brand ambassadors.

In 2019 SportPesa announced a deal with mobile operator Cell C, allowing Cell C customers to play and manage their SportPesa accounts through USSD, free of charge.  Pioneering USSD and SMS betting in South Africa.

In April 2019, SportPesa announced ‘Coaches to Count On’.  A new scheme which saw coaching staff from SportPesa partners and English football clubs Arsenal, Southampton, and Hull visit South Africa, Tanzania and Kenya to provide coaching clinics for aspiring coaches in the local communities.

In 2022 SportPesa announced a partnership with Ithotho for the Dundee July & Harry Gwala Summer Cup.  South Africa’s two biggest domestic rural horseracing events which are key fixtures in the racing calendar.  SportPesa continues their association with both events as key stakeholders and sponsors of both the Dundee July and the Harry Gwala Summer Cup.  They work closely with the Department of Sport & Recreation and the National Horseracing Authority (NHA) to ensure the upliftment of the communities that host the events as well as the safety of the participating horses.

Global Partnerships 
SportPesa brand was previously in partnerships with five English football clubs – Everton, Arsenal, Southampton, Hull City.

In 2017 it was announced that SportPesa where to become Everton’s principal partner with a Club-record multi-year agreement, the most lucrative in the Club’s 140-year history. 

In 2019, SportPesa became an Official Partner of the Club’s charitable arm Everton in the Community.  The partnership saw SportPesa provide funding for Everton in the Community’s long-standing flagship mental health programme ‘Imagine Your Goals’, which since April 2018 was affected by external NHS budget cuts. 

The partnership also saw SportPesa become a ‘Founding Partner’ of Everton in the Community’s mental-health focused campaign, ‘The People’s Place’, a purpose-built mental health facility near to Goodison Park to support anyone in need. In addition to a financial contribution to The People’s Place, SportPesa created ‘Goals That Give’, a new initiative to donate £1,000 for every Everton goal scored at Goodison Park for the entire length of the partnership.

In 2020, it was announced that the partnerships would end after the 2019-20 season.

Formula 1 
On 13 February 2019 it was announced that SportPesa became the new title sponsor for the Racing Point F1 Team for the 2019 season. The team was officially entered as SportPesa Racing Point F1 Team finishing the season in 7th place with 73 points.  SportPesa later terminated the deal in February 2020.

SportPesa Super Cup 
In June 2016 SportPesa announced the first SportPesa Super Cup, an eight-team football knockout tournament that featured four teams each from  Kenya and Tanzania. The first edition was held in Tanzania where Kenya's Gor Mahia FC emerged the tournament winner. The Winner of the SportPesa Super Cup played Everton FC on 13 July 2017 in the most successful football event in East Africa ever.

Recognition and awards 
In 2016, SportPesa won the Best African Sponsorship Award at the Discovery Sports Industry Awards (DSIA). In 2017, was recognized as a Superbrand, placed 13th in the ranking of the best companies in Kenya. It has also been previously recognised for being among top tax payers in Kenya.

References 

Online gambling companies of Kenya
2014 establishments in Kenya
Companies established in 2014